Al-Thawrah ( ath-thawrah, meaning "the revolution")  is a Syrian village located in Qalaat al-Madiq Subdistrict in Al-Suqaylabiyah District, Hama.  According to the Syria Central Bureau of Statistics (CBS), the village had a population of 632 in the 2004 census.

References 

Populated places in al-Suqaylabiyah District